The 1924 College Football All-Southern Team consists of American football players selected to the College Football All-Southern Teams selected by various organizations for the 1924 Southern Conference football season.

Alabama won the SoCon championship. Centre defeated Alabama and claims a Southern championship, even though Centre was never a member of the Southern Conference.

Composite eleven

The composite All-Southern eleven compiled by the Atlanta Journal included:
Goldy Goldstein, tackle for Florida. Goldstein was one of the first Jews to ever play for the Gators. He played professionally for the Newark Bears of the first American Football League (AFL), and was later an attorney practicing in Miami Beach.
Pooley Hubert, halfback for Alabama, inducted into the College Football Hall of Fame in 1964. While he was his team's best passer, he was also heralded as one of the game's best ever defensive backs. Coach Wallace Wade called him  "undoubtedly one of the greatest football players of all time."
Edgar C. Jones, quarterback for Florida, later athletic director at his alma mater and a banker.
Fats Lawrence, center for Auburn. An all-time Auburn team notes ""Big" Thigpen", "Tubby" Lockwood, and "Fats" Lawrence were man-mountains."
Clyde Propst, center for Alabama, known as "Shorty," second team All-American selection of Lawrence Perry. He later coached, once head coach at Howard and Southwestern.
Gil Reese, "the Tupelo flash", halfback for Vanderbilt, scored in the 16–0 victory over Minnesota. He was selected a third-team All-American by Norman E. Brown.
Bob Rives, tackle for Vanderbilt. Rives was considered the greatest football player ever to come out of Hopkinsville High School in Hopkinsville, Kentucky. He played professionally for the Newark Bears and later was for several years a referee for high school football games throughout Tennessee.
Jim Taylor, tackle for Georgia, also selected a third-team All-American by Norman E. Brown.
Smack Thompson, end for Georgia. Brother of Charlie Thompson.
Henry Wakefield, end for Vanderbilt, known as "Hek," second-team Walter Camp All-American. As an interim team captain following the loss of both Kelly and Bomar to injuries, he scored twice in the Commodores' 13–0 win over the Auburn Tigers, and defeated the Georgia Tech Yellow Jackets 3–0 with a 37-yard drop-kick field goal. He also played every minute of an inspired game against Minnesota.
Doug Wycoff, fullback for Georgia Tech. Coach Alexander recalled "The work of Douglas Wycoff against Notre Dame two years in succession was brilliant in the extreme, as was his plunging against Penn State when we defeated them twice." Wycoff played professionally for various teams in both the AFL and NFL including with the Newark Bears.  He was inducted into the Georgia Sports Hall of Fame in 1978.

All-Southerns of 1924

Ends

Hek Wakefield*, Vanderbilt 
Smack Thompson, Georgia 
Cliff Lemon, Centre 
G. B. Ollinger, Auburn 
King, Georgia Tech 
James Kay Thomas, Washington 
Ab Kirwan, Kentucky 
Joe Tilghman, Furman

Tackles
Bob Rives, Vanderbilt 
Jim Taylor, Georgia 
Red Simmons, Mercer 
Walter Skidmore, Centre 
Minos Gordy, Centre 
Curtis Luckey, Georgia 
Samuel Oscar Graham, VPI 
Cy Williams, Florida 
Noisy Grisham, Auburn

Guards

Goldy Goldstein, Florida 
Ben Compton, Alabama 
Ike Joselove, Georgia 
Walt Godwin, Georgia Tech 
Bill Buckler, Alabama 
J. Lawrence, Tulane 
George Gardner, Georgia Tech 
Earl McFaden, Auburn 
Fatty Lawrence, Vanderbilt 
Lynch, Centre 
Irish Levy, Tulane

Centers
Fats Lawrence, Auburn 
Shorty Propst, Alabama 
Ed Kubale, Centre

Quarterbacks

Edgar C. Jones, Florida 
Herb Covington, Centre 
Scrappy Moore, Georgia 
Grant Gillis, Alabama 
A. C. Carter Diffey, Virginia 
Lester Lautenschlaeger, Tulane

Halfbacks
Pooley Hubert, Alabama (College Football Hall of Fame) 
Gil Reese, Vanderbilt 
Brother Brown, Tulane 
Ark Newton, Florida 
Martin Kilpatrick, Georgia 
David Rosenfeld, Alabama 
Johnny Mack Brown, Alabama

Fullbacks
Doug Wycoff, Georgia Tech 
Tom Ryan, Vanderbilt 
James D. Thomason, Georgia 
Eddie Cameron, Washington & Lee

Key

Bold = Consensus selection

* = Consensus All-American

C = Composite selections from the Atlanta Journal.

C2 = A second composite selection. Both were drawn by writers from Birmingham, Atlanta, Louisville, Nashville, Memphis, Chattanooga, New Orleans, Montgomery, Shreveport, Knoxville, Jacksonville, Columbus, and Columbia.

AS = selected by Anniston coaches and The Anniston Star.

NB = selected by Norman E. Brown.

CH = selected by Happy Chandler, scout for the Centre Colonels football team.

FH = selected by Fox Howe, coach of AMI.

UGA = received most votes at their position by the players of the Georgia Bulldogs football team.

VU = received votes at their position by the players of the Vanderbilt Commodores football team.

BE = Billy Evans's "Southern Honor Roll"

See also
1924 College Football All-America Team

References

1924 Southern Conference football season
College Football All-Southern Teams